See Trygve Henrik Hoff for the singer, composer and artist.

Trygve J. B. Hoff (12 November 1895 – 4 January 1982) born in Kristiana, Norway was a Norwegian businessman, writer and editor of Farmand, the Norwegian business magazine.

Background
Hoff was born in Oslo as a son of lawyer Alf Eid Rosenberg Hoff and Margrethe Jacobsen. Throughout his life Hoff remained attached to the Hoff family estate at Tjøme.

In 1916, Hoff graduated from the Royal Frederick University with a degree in economics. After his graduation, he travelled to France; then later to the United States, where he studied banking and finance and worked on Wall Street.

He was first married to Astrid Henriette Gundersen in August 1920 until her death in 1947. They had three children: Per Reinhardt Hoff (born 1922), Margrethe Hoff (born 1924), and Ole-Jacob Hoff (born 1928). Later on, he married Aase Synnøve Bye on 18 September 1948.

Career
Though he started writing in Dagbladet as an economics writer in 1920, Hoff was well known for being an editor and writer in Farmand, a business magazine he bought in 1935. Hoff built Farmand to become the leading Norwegian business magazine of his time. At Farmand, he was well known for being an outspoken editor. He also made a clear policy that Farmand should be an apolitical body for the industry's freedom. In an article he wrote in 1935, he said: "We look not only at this battle for corporate social freedom from an economic standpoint. We regard it as part of the struggle for personal liberty and freedom of speech. Both the dictatorship States and in home runs fight against corporate social freedom go hand in hand with the fight against personal freedom and freedom of expression."

Political views
While studying economics at the University of Oslo in 1938, he became interested in the economic calculation debate and engaged in it on the side of the Austrian School which became his doctoral dissertation ("Calculation in a Socialist Planned Economy").

His doctoral dissertation was however ignored, and researchers point to the political views of his professors most prominently Ragnar Frisch strong socialist-leanings and Norwegian Labour Party affiliations and the post-World War political atmosphere as being perhaps the cause of this underappreciation. As well during the German occupation of Norway 1940–1945, Hoff was put in jail by the Germans for his political views. Farmand was banned by the occupation government and was therefore not published in the occupation years 1940–1945.

Mont Pelerin Society

Trygve Hoff was one of the founding member of the Mont Pelerin Society. As author, he contributed to the economic calculation debate, starting with his 1938 book Økonomisk kalkulasjon i socialistiske samfund (English: Economic Calculation in the Socialist Society).

Publications
  Farmand Norsk Forretningsblad, 1938–1982

The following are the books that were authored by Hoff:
 Økonomisk kalkulasjon i socialistiske samfund, 1938
 Fred og fremtid: liberokratiets vei, 1945
 Västerländsk frihet eller asiatiskt tvång, 1946
 Why We Take the Trouble, 1946
 La socialisation en Norvège, 1953
 Snigende socialisering eller snigende liberalisering, 1955
 Trygve J.B. Hoff: Tanker og idéer, 1975, 
 Ny kulturpolitikk: frå ord til handling, 1978 with Lars Hauge,

References

Bibliography
 Economic Calculation in the Socialist Society (Full Text; 1938)

1895 births
1982 deaths
Austrian School economists
20th-century Norwegian businesspeople
Norwegian writers